Loktevsky District is an administrative and municipal district (raion), one of the fifty-nine in Altai Krai, Russia. It is located in the southwest of the krai. Its administrative center is the town of Gornyak. Population:  The population of Gornyak accounts for 46.9% of the district's total population.

References

Notes

Sources

Districts of Altai Krai